William Powell (circa 1681 - 13 April 1751) was an eighteenth century British Anglican priest.

Powell was born circa 1681 at Hampton Court. He was educated at Eton and St John's College, Cambridge He held livings at Lambourn, Langwmdinmael and Llanyblodwel. He was  Dean of St Asaph from 1731 until 1751; and Archdeacon of Chester from his installation on 22 April 1747 until his death on 13 April 1751.

References

1751 deaths
People educated at Eton College
18th-century English Anglican priests
Archdeacons of Chester
Deans of St Asaph
Alumni of St John's College, Cambridge
People from Surrey (before 1889)
Year of birth uncertain